Donnell Lee Wall (born July 11, 1967) is a former professional baseball player who pitched in Major League Baseball for the Houston Astros, San Diego Padres, New York Mets, and Anaheim Angels, primarily in relief from 1995 to 2002.

Wall was born in Potosi, Missouri.

In 234 games in the majors, Wall compiled a 31–28 record, with 322 strikeouts and a 4.20 ERA. Wall was the losing pitcher for the Padres in Game 1 of the 1998 World Series.

External links
, or Pelota Binaria

1967 births
Living people
Anaheim Angels players
Asheville Tourists players
Auburn Astros players
Baseball players from Missouri
Binghamton Mets players
Burlington Astros players
Colorado Springs Sky Sox players
Houston Astros players
Jackson Generals (Texas League) players
Las Vegas Stars (baseball) players
Louisiana Ragin' Cajuns baseball players
Major League Baseball pitchers
Navegantes del Magallanes players
American expatriate baseball players in Venezuela
New Orleans Zephyrs players
New York Mets players
Norfolk Tides players
Osceola Astros players
Pacific Coast League MVP award winners
People from Potosi, Missouri
Salt Lake Stingers players
San Diego Padres players
Tucson Toros players
University of Louisiana at Lafayette alumni
American expatriate baseball players in Australia